The Hayashi Cabinet is the 33rd Cabinet of Japan led by Senjūrō Hayashi from February 2 to June 4, 1937.

Cabinet

References 

Cabinet of Japan
1937 establishments in Japan
Cabinets established in 1937
Cabinets disestablished in 1937